Streptomyces turgidiscabies is a streptomycete bacterium species, causing scab in potatoes. It has flexuous spore, the latter which are cylindrical and smooth. The type strain is SY9113T (= ATCC 700248T = IFO 16080T). It is almost identical to Streptomyces reticuliscabiei; however, they are considered distinct species given the diseases they cause are different.

References

Further reading
Joshi, Madhumita V., and Rosemary Loria. "Streptomyces turgidiscabies possesses a functional cytokinin biosynthetic pathway and produces leafy galls." Molecular plant-microbe interactions 20.7 (2007): 751–758.

Thwaites, R., et al. "Streptomyces turgidiscabies and S. acidiscabies: two new causal agents of common scab of potato (Solanum tuberosum) in the UK."Plant Pathology 59.4 (2010): 804-804.

External links

LPSN
Type strain of Streptomyces turgidiscabies at BacDive -  the Bacterial Diversity Metadatabase

turgidiscabies
Bacteria described in 1998